Clifton in New Zealand may refer to:
Clifton, Christchurch, a hillside suburb above Sumner in Christchurch
Clifton, Hawke's Bay, a coastal beach reserve near Napier
Clifton, Invercargill, a southern suburb of Invercargill
Clifton, Tasman, a locality in Golden Bay